IRAS 23304+6147 is a protoplanetary nebula in the constellation Cassiopeia, 16,000 light years away.  The central star is a G-type supergiant.

Its spectrum also shows other s-process elements such as barium, yttrium, and lanthanum.

The central star of the protoplanetary nebula has been found to be variable with a small range from visual magnitude +12.99 to +13.15.  Although several periods have been identified, these change from year to year and the star has been classified as irregular. The optical variability is dominated by slow pulsation with 83.8 d period, overlapped by faster pulsation modes.

IRAS 23304+6147 is about 15,000 light years away and over eight thousand times as luminous as the sun.  It lies in the direction of the Cassiopeia OB7 stellar association, but is thought to be further away.

References

G-type supergiants
Cassiopeia (constellation)
IRAS catalogue objects
Post-asymptotic-giant-branch stars
J23324479+6203491
Protoplanetary nebulae
Slow irregular variables